Grzegórzki may refer to the following places in Poland:
Grzegórzki, Kraków
Grzegórzki, Warmian-Masurian Voivodeship